Ham Common may refer to:

 Ham Common, Dorset, England
 Ham Common, London, England
 Ham Common, location of RAAF Base Richmond, City of Hawkesbury, New South Wales, Australia